Kelsey Stevenson (born 29 May 1990) is a Canadian tennis player.

Stevenson has a career high ATP singles ranking of 654 achieved on 30 November 2020. He also has a career high doubles ranking of 255 achieved on 02 January 2023 and is currently the second highest ranked doubles player in Canada.

Stevenson has won 1 ATP Challenger doubles title at the 2022 Winnipeg National Bank Challenger with Billy Harris.

Stevenson has also won 1 ITF Futures singles title as well as 7 ITF Futures events in doubles.

ATP Challenger and ITF Futures finals

Singles: 2 (1–1)

Doubles: 18 (8–10)

References

External links
 
 

1990 births
Living people
Canadian male tennis players
Sportspeople from Toronto
20th-century Canadian people
21st-century Canadian people